In abstract algebra, an element  of a ring  is called a left zero divisor if there exists a nonzero  in  such that , or equivalently if the map from  to  that sends  to  is not injective.  Similarly, an element  of a ring is called a right zero divisor if there exists a nonzero  in  such that .  This is a partial case of divisibility in rings.  An element that is a left or a right zero divisor is simply called a zero divisor. An element  that is both a left and a right zero divisor is called a two-sided zero divisor (the nonzero  such that  may be different from the nonzero  such that ). If the ring is commutative, then the left and right zero divisors are the same.

An element of a ring that is not a left zero divisor is called left regular or left cancellable.  Similarly, an element of a ring that is not a right zero divisor is called right regular or right cancellable.
An element of a ring that is left and right cancellable, and is hence not a zero divisor, is called regular or cancellable, or a non-zero-divisor.  A zero divisor that is nonzero is called a nonzero zero divisor or a nontrivial zero divisor.  A nonzero ring with no nontrivial zero divisors is called a domain.

Examples 

 In the ring , the residue class  is a zero divisor since .
 A nilpotent element of a nonzero ring is always a two-sided zero divisor.
 An idempotent element  of a ring is always a two-sided zero divisor, since .
 The ring of  matrices over a field has nonzero zero divisors if . Examples of zero divisors in the ring of  matrices (over any nonzero ring) are shown here:  
A direct product of two or more nonzero rings always has nonzero zero divisors.
Let  be a field and  be a group. Suppose that  has an element  of finite order .

One-sided zero-divisor
If , then  is a left zero divisor if and only if  is even, since , and it is a right zero divisor if and only if  is even for similar reasons.
Here is another example of a ring with an element that is a zero divisor on one side only. Let  be the set of all sequences of integers . Three examples of elements of this ring are the right shift , the left shift , and the projection map onto the first factor .

Non-examples 

 The ring of integers modulo a prime number has no nonzero zero divisors.  Since every nonzero element is a unit, this ring is a finite field.
 More generally, a division ring has no nonzero zero divisors.
 A nonzero commutative ring whose only zero divisor is 0 is called an integral domain.

Properties 

 In the ring of -by- matrices over a field, the left and right zero divisors coincide; they are precisely the singular matrices. In the ring of -by- matrices over an integral domain, the zero divisors are precisely the matrices with determinant zero.
 An element is cancellable on the side on which it is regular.  That is, if  is a left regular,  implies that , and similarly for right regular.

Zero as a zero divisor

There is no need for a separate convention for the case , because the definition applies also in this case: 
 If  is a ring other than the zero ring, then  is a (two-sided) zero divisor, because any nonzero element  satisfies .

Some references include or exclude  as a zero divisor in all rings by convention, but they then suffer from having to introduce exceptions in statements such as the following:
(This, in turn, is important for the definition of the total quotient ring.) The same is true of the set of non-left-zero-divisors and the set of non-right-zero-divisors in an arbitrary ring, commutative or not.

Zero divisor on a module
One says that  is -regular if the "multiplication by " map  is injective, and that  is a zero divisor on  otherwise.

Specializing the definitions of "-regular" and "zero divisor on " to the case  recovers the definitions of "regular" and "zero divisor" given earlier in this article.

See also 
 Zero-product property
 Glossary of commutative algebra (Exact zero divisor)
 Zero-divisor graph

Notes

References

Further reading 
 
 
 

Abstract algebra
Ring theory
0 (number)